
The following is a list of Playboy Playmates of 1978. Playboy magazine names their Playmate of the Month each month throughout the year.

January

Debra Jensen (born March 12, 1958 in Orange County, California) is an American model. She was Playboy magazine's Playmate of the Month for its January 1978 issue. Her centerfold was photographed by Phillip Dixon.

After her Playmate appearance, Debra married KISS drummer Peter Criss; the two eventually divorced.

February

Janis Schmitt (born March 14, 1947 in St. Louis, Missouri) is an American model and actress. She was Playboy magazine's Playmate of the Month for its February 1978 issue. Her centerfold was photographed by Ken Marcus. Schmitt worked as a bunny at the Playboy Club in St Louis.

March

Christina Smith (born October 4, 1957 in Miami, Florida) is an American model. She was Playboy magazine's Playmate of the Month for March 1978. She also appeared in The Girls of Summer Special Editions at least twice, was profiled in Playboy's "Pop Questions" section in Playboy's April 2008 edition, and was most recently profiled in Playboy's Wet 'n' Wild Special Edition in January 2015. Christina Smith was the first Playmate Arny Freytag ever photographed for Playboy.

April

Pamela Jean Bryant (born February 8, 1959 in Indianapolis, Indiana - December 5, 2010) was an American model and actress. She was Playboy magazine's Playmate of the Month for its April 1978 issue. Her centerfold was photographed by Richard Fegley. Bryant first appeared in Playboy in the September 1977 pictorial "The Girls of the Big Ten". Bryant worked as an artist before her death of an asthma attack.

May

Kathryn Morrison (born October 2, 1955; Long Beach, California) is an American model. She was Playboy magazine's Playmate of the Month for its May 1978 issue. Her centerfold was photographed by Phillip Dixon and Dwight Hooker.

June

Gail Stanton (November 19, 1954 in Memphis, Tennessee – November 21, 1996 in Memphis) was an American model. She was Playboy magazine's Playmate of the Month for its June 1978 issue. Her centerfold was photographed by David Chan.  She was originally photographed for a layout in the April 1977 issue entitled "Girls of the New South". Stanton died two days after her 42nd birthday, on November 21, 1996 of complications from a blockage to her colon.

July

Karen Elaine Morton was Playboy's Miss July 1978. Her centerfold was shot by Ken Marcus. Later on, Karen had a small part in the Mel Brooks film History of the World, Part I (1981), and went on to a modeling career in Europe.
Her cousin, Elaine Morton, was the June 1970 Playmate.

She played Jenny in the video for Tommy Tutone's "867-5309/Jenny".

She developed Stevens–Johnson syndrome in 2004, which caused her to go blind, and died on February 11, 2014.

August

Vicki Witt (born April 13, 1959) is an American model. She was Playboy magazine's Playmate of the Month for its August 1978 issue. Her centerfold was photographed by Pompeo Posar. She posed for the September 1977 "Girls of the Big Ten" pictorial before becoming a Playmate the following year. Witt continued to work for Playboy for a few years following her selection as a Playmate.

September

Rosanne Katon (born February 5, 1954) is an American model, actress, comedian, and activist. She was Playboy magazine's Playmate of the Month for its September 1978 issue. Her centerfold was photographed by Mario Casilli.

In 1984, Katon married Richard Walden, the president and chief executive officer of Operation USA, an international organization that supplies relief to Third World areas in need. The Waldens have two children, including a son who is autistic and an expert cellist. The family is featured in the 2007 documentary Autism: The Musical, which won the 2007 Emmy for Best TV Documentary Special (HBO).

October

Marcy Hanson (born December 22, 1952 in Galveston, Texas) is an American model and actress.

She was Playboy magazine's Playmate of the Month for its October 1978 issue. Her centerfold was photographed by Mario Casilli. Before Hanson became a Playmate, she had a lead role on the short-lived NBC comedy series The Roller Girls.

November

Monique St. Pierre (born November 25, 1953) is a German-American model and actress.  She was Playboy magazine's Playmate of the Month for November 1978 issue and the 1979 Playmate of the Year. Her original centerfold was photographed by Richard Fegley.

St. Pierre was born in Wiesbaden, Germany, and speaks English, German and French. She had signed with the Wilhelmina modeling agency just prior to being chosen to be a Playmate, but was fired soon after her first pictorial was published. She stayed with Playboy both as a model and as an executive, eventually holding a top position at the fledgling Playboy Channel. In 2017 at the age 64 St. Pierre duplicated her Playmate of the Year cover along with her cohorts Kimberley Conrad, Renee Tenison, Candace Collins, Lisa Matthews, Cathy St. George, and Charlotte Kemp, and nearly four decades on.

December

Janet Quist (born August 17, 1955 in Austin, Texas) is an American model and actress. She was Playboy magazine's Playmate of the Month for its December 1978 issue. Her centerfold was photographed by Ken Marcus. Janet came to Playboy's attention through a "Playmate Photo Contest" that the magazine staged in 1977. She was later featured in Outlaw Blues, a movie set in Austin.

See also
 List of people in Playboy 1970–1979

References

1978-related lists
1978
Playmates Of 1978